The Better Man is a 1926 American silent comedy film directed by Scott R. Dunlap and starring Richard Talmadge, Ena Gregory and John Steppling.

Plot

Cast
 Richard Talmadge as Lord Hugh Wainwright 
 Ena Gregory as Nancy Burton 
 John Steppling as Phineas Ward 
 Margaret Campbell as Mrs. Ward 
 Herbert Prior as John Knolwton 
 Charles Hill Mailes as Charles Clifton 
 Percy Williams as Hawkins

References

Bibliography
 Munden, Kenneth White. The American Film Institute Catalog of Motion Pictures Produced in the United States, Part 1. University of California Press, 1997.

External links

1926 films
1926 comedy films
Silent American comedy films
Films directed by Scott R. Dunlap
American silent feature films
1920s English-language films
Film Booking Offices of America films
American black-and-white films
1920s American films